Romina Stefancic (born July 21, 1978) is a Slovenian-Canadian rower. Born in Slovenia, she received Canadian citizenship in 2004, prior to competing in the 2004 Summer Olympics.

She finished in fourth place at the 2008 Summer Olympic Games in Beijing, China in the women's eights with Ashley Brzozowicz, Darcy Marquardt, Buffy-Lynne Williams, Jane Thornton, Sarah Bonikowsky, Andréanne Morin, Heather Mandoli and cox Lesley Thompson-Willie.

External links
Profile at Rowing Canada

1978 births
Canadian female rowers
Living people
Naturalized citizens of Canada
Olympic rowers of Canada
Rowers at the 2004 Summer Olympics
Rowers at the 2008 Summer Olympics
Slovenian emigrants to Canada
Slovenian female rowers
University of Victoria alumni